Shota Arveladze (born 22 February 1973) is a Georgian professional football manager and former player who was most recently the manager of EFL Championship club Hull City.

Arveladze played at Dinamo Tbilisi, Trabzonspor, Ajax, Rangers, AZ and Levante. He is Georgia's all-time top scorer with 291 goals in his 410 league games for his clubs and 26 goals in his 61 games for the national team.

His 27 goals scored in the UEFA Cup competition, including qualifiers ranks him third in the tournament's history before it became the Europa League. He has the best strike record of independent Georgian Football. He was nominated as the best player of Georgia as well as the best player by the Georgian Professional Football league survey.

Club career

Tbilisi and Trabzonspor
Arveladze played at Dinamo Tbilisi, Trabzonspor, and Ajax, and finished at least one season as the top goal scorer at all three. In 1993, he scored an effective first Euro Tournament goal in the history of independent Georgian Football in the match against Linfield, Northern Ireland. When he led Trabzonspor in goals in 1995–96, he also led the Süper Lig, making him the second non-Turk to date to lead that league in goals after Tarik Hodžić 1983–84. He is recorded as "most loved foreign player" for Trabzonspor supporters.

Ajax Amsterdam
In summer 1997, Arveladze signed for Ajax Amsterdam. Later, he declared that he was so nervous during his first training session, that he even forgot to take football boots with him. He became a close friend to Ronald de Boer during his spell in Amsterdam. His first game at Amsterdam Arena was a special day for the Georgian player. On 15 August 1997, Ajax Amsterdam faced Brazilian side Grêmio in a friendly game. Arveladze scored a goal, while his wife Tamuna gave birth to their first child, Giorgi hours before the game.

Arveladze made a debut for Ajax against Vitesse Arnhem, where he replaced Gerald Sibon and scored the fourth goal for the club. During his first season, he scored three hat-tricks in Eredivisie and total 25 goals in 31 appearances. The manager of the Amsterdam-based club Morten Olsen was very pleased with the performance of the young striker. Arveladze was a key figure for the club during 1997–98 UEFA Cup as well. He scored 7 goals in 8 games for the club, including hat-trick against NK Maribor. Ajax were eliminated in quarter-finals, against Spartak Moscow. Arveladze scored the club's single goal in a tie. During his first season, he faced twice NAC Breda, where his twin brother Archil played. This remains as one of the most memorable facts in Shota's career.

In summer 1998, Ajax signed Arveladze's close friend Giorgi Kinkladze from Manchester City for £5 million. They had been friends since their childhood and that looked like a dream move for both. However, Kinkladze's spell at Ajax proved unsuccessful.

Rangers
Arveladze joined Rangers from Ajax for £3m in 2001. He agreed a four-year deal with the club. It was obvious that the Georgian would face a fierce competitions for the starting place in the Rangers' strikeforce from the players like Tore Andre Flo, Claudio Caniggia, Michael Mols, Kenny Miller, Billy Dodds, Ronald de Boer and Russell Latapy.

During the first season with Glasgow-based club, Arveladze scored 17 goals overall, including 11 in Scottish Premier League. He only managed to take part in 30 games, after being injured in February in the quarterfinal of the Scottish Cup against Forfar Athletic, an injury which meant he missed the 2002 Scottish League Cup Final. However, he scored six goals for his club, which managed to win the title. Arveladze played in the final, replacing Claudio Caniggia. This was his first title with the Scottish club.

The following season was the most successful in the career of the Georgian player. Rangers won treble. In March 2003, Rangers defeated their arch-rivals Celtic in the League Cup Final. Later in the Scottish Cup Final, Rangers won another title, after they managed to defeat Dundee with a goal from Lorenzo Amoruso. Arveladze's two compatriots Georgi Nemsadze and Zurab Khizanishvili also took part in this game. The latter joined Arveladze at Rangers during that summer.

In May 2005, Arveladze declared that he would leave the club after the end of the season, in which he managed to score 9 goals. He confirmed receiving offers from various clubs in Europe, including teams from England, Germany, the Netherlands and Turkey.

During his time at Rangers, Arveladze had a nickname, Mr. Bean, because of his facial likeness to Rowan Atkinson.

During a legal case in 2015, Arveladze's agent claimed that the true transfer fee had been 12 million Euro, the equivalent of £8.5 million at the time. Arveladze scored the 300th goal in the SPL and was part of Rangers squads that won the domestic treble in 2002–03 and a double in 2004–05.

AZ
Arveladze departed Rangers for Dutch side AZ on a free transfer before the start of 2005–06 season, signing a two-year deal with the club.

Under the guidance of Louis van Gaal, Arveladze became the key figure of the club. He scored 22 goals in Eredivisie, becoming the second best top-scorer of the tournament after Klaas-Jan Huntelaar, who scored 33 goals during the season. Alkmaar participated in UEFA Cup this time as well. In 6 game for the club, Arveladze made 2 assists and scored 2 goals, one of them against Real Betis. At the end of the season, AZ Alkmaar and Arveladze agreed a contract extension to keep the Georgian international striker at the Dutch club until the summer of 2008.

During the second and the final season with the club, Arveladze was appointed as the new captain of the club. He was offered the armband after Denny Landzaat and Joris Mathijsen left for Wigan Athletic and Hamburger SV respectively. The Georgian was praised by Louis van Gaal, under whose guidance he played at Ajax Amsterdam as well. Van Gaal compared Arveladze to Danny Blind and Frank Rijkaard in terms of personality, calling him the top professional in the squad.

He scored 23 goals, accumulating total 48 goals for AZ in 89 competitive appearances. The Georgian striker scored 7 goals in UEFA Cup as well, two of them in Ramón Sánchez Pizjuán Stadium in a 2–1 away win against Sevilla.

Levante
In July 2007, Arveladze passed a medical and agreed a one-year contract with the Spanish club Levante. He was injured in summer training and missed nearly ten months, undergoing surgery in Amsterdam. He returned and made his debut against Villarreal on 23 March, replacing Juanma. He managed to take part in other 3 games until the end of the season.

In April, Levante confirmed that Arveladze would retire at the end of the season. In the last game of his career he played at Santiago Bernabeu against Real Madrid, losing 5–2.

International career
Shota Arveladze was a regular in the Georgian national team and is its all-time leading scorer with 26 goals in his 61 games.

He made his international debut in Georgia's first official game on 2 September 1992, a 1–0 friendly loss away to Lithuania. Fifteen days later, he scored his first goal in the country's first home game, a 6–3 win over neighbours Azerbaijan. His first competitive goal was on 16 November, in a 5–0 win over Wales in Tbilisi for UEFA Euro 1996 qualifying.

On 30 March 1997, Arveladze scored a hat-trick in a 7–0 home friendly win against neighbours Armenia. With Georgia he won in 1998 the Malta International Football Tournament. On 18 August 2006, he scored a hat-trick away to the Faroe Islands in a 6–0 win in the opening game of UEFA Euro 2008 qualifying. His final game was the following 24 March in another qualifier, equalising in a 2–1 loss away to Scotland.

Coaching career
After retiring as a player, Arveladze was appointed as assistant manager of AZ under head coach and former Ajax coach Louis van Gaal in July 2008. He maintained this position in the 2009–10 season under Ronald Koeman and Dick Advocaat.

For the 2010–11 season, Arveladze served as manager of Turkish side Kayserispor. From 2012 to 2015, he managed Istanbul-based Kasımpaşa SK. In his final game, the team scored away to Konyaspor while their players were attending to his injured player, Ryan Babel. Arveladze then allowed Konyaspor to score an equaliser in the name of fair play, and Konyaspor won the game 2–1. He resigned after the game.

On 3 July 2015, Arveladze was named manager of Turkish side Trabzonspor. He resigned in November. Under him and his successor Hami Mandıralı, the side lost a record 17 games that season.

In June 2016 Arveladze was announced as the new head coach of Israeli club Maccabi Tel Aviv Around the middle of the season, he was fired; it was the first time that Maccabi dismissed a coach during a season since 2011.

In 2017, Arveladze was announced as head coach of Pakhtakor Tashkent FK in Uzbekistan. He won the Uzbekistan Super League and Cup in 2019 and 2020. On 21 December 2020, he left.

On 27 January 2022, Arveladze was announced as the new head coach of Hull City on a 2-year deal. On his debut two days later, the team won 2–0 at home to Swansea City. Arveladze was dismissed by Hull City on 30 September 2022, with the team 20th in the EFL Championship and after four consecutive defeats.

Personal life
Arveladze's brothers Archil (twin) and Revaz (older) also played international football, as did Revaz's son Vato.

Career statistics

Club

International

Scores and results list Georgia's goal tally first, score column indicates score after each Arveladze goal.

Managerial statistics

Honours

Player
Dinamo Tbilisi
Umaglesi Liga: 1990–91, 1991–92, 1992–93, 1993–94
Georgian Cup: 1990–91, 1991–92, 1992–93, 1993–94

Trabzonspor
Turkish Cup: 1994–95
Turkish Super Cup: 1995

Ajax
Eredivisie: 1997–98
KNVB Cup: 1997–98, 1998–99

Rangers
Scottish Premier League: 2002–03, 2004–05
Scottish Cup: 2001–02, 2002–03
Scottish League Cup: 2002–03

Individual
CIS Cup top goalscorer: 1993
Turkish Footballer of the Year: 1994
Georgian Footballer of the Year: 1994, 1998, 2007
Turkish Cup top scorer: 1994–95
Süper Lig top scorer: 1995–96
SPL Player of the Month: September 2003

Manager
Pakhtakor Tashkent
Uzbekistan Super League: 2019, 2020
Uzbekistan Cup: 2019, 2020
Uzbekistan League Cup: 2019

See also
List of Süper Lig top scorers

References

External links

 (as coach)
Profile at Mackolik.com
Shota Arveladze at Kayserispor.org

1973 births
Living people
Footballers from Tbilisi
Footballers from Georgia (country)
Football managers from Georgia (country)
Association football forwards
FC Dinamo Tbilisi players
Trabzonspor footballers
AFC Ajax players
Rangers F.C. players
AZ Alkmaar players
Levante UD footballers
Eredivisie players
Scottish Premier League players
La Liga players
Georgia (country) international footballers
Expatriate footballers from Georgia (country)
Expatriate sportspeople from Georgia (country) in Turkey
Expatriate footballers in Turkey
Expatriate sportspeople from Georgia (country) in the Netherlands
Expatriate footballers in the Netherlands
Expatriate sportspeople from Georgia (country) in Scotland
Expatriate footballers in Scotland
Expatriate sportspeople from Georgia (country) in Spain
Expatriate footballers in Spain
Expatriate football managers in Turkey
Expatriate football managers in Israel
Expatriate football managers in Uzbekistan
Expatriate football managers in England
Expatriate sportspeople from Georgia (country) in Israel
Expatriate sportspeople from Georgia (country) in Uzbekistan
Expatriate sportspeople from Georgia (country) in England
Süper Lig players
Kasımpaşa S.K. managers
Trabzonspor managers
Kayserispor managers
Maccabi Tel Aviv F.C. managers
Pakhtakor Tashkent FK managers
Hull City A.F.C. managers
Süper Lig managers
Israeli Premier League managers
English Football League managers
Identical twins
Twin sportspeople
Twins from Georgia (country)
AZ Alkmaar non-playing staff